Arteshbod Mohammad Amir Khatami (1920 – 12 September 1975), CVO, was the commander of the Imperial Iranian Air Force, advisor to Shah Mohammad Reza Pahlavi and the second husband of Fatemeh Pahlavi, half-sister of the Shah.

Early life and education
Khatami was born in Rasht in 1920. His father was a tea house owner and later dealt with real estate. His mother was a relative of Imam Jomeh, a significant religious figure in Tehran and a relative of Nasr ed Din Shah.

After graduating from the Alborz High School in Tehran, Khatami attended the military high school. In 1939, he began to study at the air force branch of the military college and graduated as a second lieutenant. Next he took pilot training courses in the United Kingdom and graduated from the Royal Air Force College Cranwell. He was also trained at Fürstenfeldbruck Air Base, Germany, in the 1950s.

Career
In 1946, Khatami was named personal pilot of the Shah. Days before the coup on 16 August 1953, the Shah, accompanied by his second wife Sorayya Esfandiary Bakhtiari and Aboul Fath Atabay, escaped from Iran to Iraq and then to Italy by a plane flown by Khatami. Khatami was also one of the military advisers of the Shah.

Later Khatami became a four-star general. In 1957 he was appointed chief of staff of the Imperial Air Force. He succeeded Hedayat Gilanshah in the post. Khatami served in this post until his death in 1975. During Khatami's long tenure, the Imperial Air Force was modeled on the U.S. Air Force and became Iran’s main striking arm. Its transport and tactical airlift capabilities were significantly expanded between 1965 and 1968. Khatami's successor was Fazael Tadayon who was appointed to the post on 14 September 1975.

In addition, Khatami served as the chairman of the board of the Iranian National Airlines and chief of the council of the Civil Aviation Department. He also had some business activities. He was co-owner of a construction company and had shares in the aviation and real estate companies.

Personal life
Khatami married twice. His first spouse was his cousin with whom he had a daughter. She was killed in an accident in 1954. Then Khatami married Princess Fatemeh Pahlavi on 22 November 1959, half-sister of the Shah. The Shah and his fiancée Farah Diba attended the wedding ceremony. They had two sons, Kambiz (born 1961) and Ramin (born 1967), and a daughter, Pari (born 1962).

In 1947 Khatami was the captain of the Iranian national football team. A declassified CIA report argues that Khatami was close to Hossein Fardoust and Taqi Alavikia, and that they were part of a dowreh, or social-political circle of associates. The dowreh, along with familial relations, was a significant element in the political functioning of Iran in the Pahlavi era. The Americans regarded Khatami as a pro-American official who might assume the role of successor to the Shah.

At the time of his death, Khatami's wealth was estimated to be nearly $100 million.

Death
Khatami died in a kiting accident on 12 September 1975 in Dezful. His death has been considered to be mysterious, and the Shah was implicated in his death.

References

External links

20th-century Iranian businesspeople
1920 births
1975 deaths
Association footballers not categorized by position
Commanders of Imperial Iranian Air Force
Commanders of the Royal Victorian Order
Golden Crown
Graduates of the Royal Air Force College Cranwell
Grand Crosses 1st class of the Order of Merit of the Federal Republic of Germany
Imperial Iranian Armed Forces four-star generals
Iranian expatriates in the United Kingdom
Iranian footballers
People from Rasht
People of Pahlavi Iran
Victims of aviation accidents or incidents in Iran